Minacovirus is a subgenus of viruses in the genus Alphacoronavirus, consisting of a single species, Mink coronavirus 1.

References

Virus subgenera
Alphacoronaviruses